"Here Comes the Hurt Again'" is a song written by Jerry Foster and Bill Rice, and recorded by American country music artist Mickey Gilley. It was released in July 1978 as the second single from his album Flyin' High. The song reached number 9 on the U.S. Billboard Hot Country Singles chart and number 43 on the Canadian RPM Country Tracks chart in Canada.

A re-recorded version of the song appears on the soundtrack to the 1980 film Urban Cowboy.

Chart performance

References

1978 singles
Mickey Gilley songs
Songs written by Bill Rice
Song recordings produced by Eddie Kilroy
Playboy Records singles
Songs written by Jerry Foster
1978 songs